Annemarie Schulz was a female international table tennis player from Germany.

She won five World Championship medals starting with two bronze medals at the 1933 World Table Tennis Championships in the women's doubles with Anita Felguth and in the mixed doubles with Nikita Madjaroglou.

This was followed by another bronze in the mixed doubles at the 1936 World Table Tennis Championships with Helmut Ullrich and then two more in the 1937 World Table Tennis Championships in the team event and doubles with Marie Kettnerová.

See also
 List of table tennis players
 List of World Table Tennis Championships medalists

References

German female table tennis players
World Table Tennis Championships medalists